Randal Hugh Vivian Smith, 2nd Baron Bicester (9 January 1898 – 15 January 1968) was an English peer and merchant banker in the City of London.

Biography

Early life
Smith was born on 9 January 1898 in London. He was the eldest son of the banker Vivian Smith (later created first Baron Bicester) and his wife Lady Sybil Mary McDonnell, a daughter of William McDonnell, 6th Earl of Antrim, and a nephew of Admiral Sir Aubrey Smith. He was educated at Eton and the Royal Military College, Sandhurst.

Career
He served with the 17th Lancers, rising to the rank of Lieutenant.

During his business years, he served as a director of Morgan, Grenfell & Co., Shell Transport and Trading, Vickers and the Bank of England. He was High Sheriff of Oxfordshire in 1945 and succeeded to his father's title of Baron Bicester in 1956.

Personal life and death
On 29 November 1922, he married Dorothea Gwenllian James, a daughter of Walter James, 3rd Baron Northbourne. They had two daughters.

He was killed in 1968, aged 70, in a motor accident. Without male issue, his title passed to his nephew, Angus Smith.

Ancestry

References

External links

1898 births
1968 deaths
2
High Sheriffs of Oxfordshire
Officers of the Order of St John
Road incident deaths in the United Kingdom
People educated at Eton College
17th Lancers officers
Graduates of the Royal Military College, Sandhurst
Randal